The white-headed langur (Trachypithecus leucocephalus) is a critically endangered species of langur endemic to Guangxi, China.

Taxonomy 
It was formerly considered a subspecies of the Cat Ba langur (T. poliocephalus), which is now thought to be endemic to Vietnam.

Its taxonomy was previously uncertain; it has been considered a partially albinistic population of the François' langur (T. francoisi), a subspecies of Francois' langur, a valid species (T. leucocephalus), or a subspecies, T. poliocephalus leucocephalus. However, the IUCN Red List and American Society of Mammalogists now recognize it as a distinct species based on a 2007 study which split both species.

Populations of this species in Chongzuo and Fusui display notable genetic divergence from the rest of the species, and it has thus been proposed they be treated as evolutionarily significant units.

Description 
This species is blackish in color with white crown, cheeks, and neck (in contrast to the similar T. poliocephalus, which has a golden crown, cheeks, and neck).

Distribution 
This species has a very small range in the province of Guangxi in southernmost China, where it is known from a few scattered populations. The Zuo River separates this species from Francois' langur, which is found to the north.

Status 
This species is considered critically endangered on the IUCN Red List. It is thought to have a population of no more than 600 individuals with roughly 250 mature individuals. None of the subpopulations of this species have more than 25 individuals. The main threat to this species is poaching and to a lesser extent habitat destruction. In addition, Francois' langurs have been released within the species' range and they have been known to hybridize with the white-headed langur, which may be genetically detrimental to it.

References 

white-headed langur
Primates of East Asia
Mammals of China
Endemic fauna of China
Critically endangered fauna of Asia
white-headed langur
Critically endangered fauna of China